John William Joseph Cowell (19 February 1887 – 13 March 1956) was an Australian rules footballer who played with St Kilda in the Victorian Football League (VFL).

Death
He died at his residence in West Coburg on 13 March 1956.

Notes

External links 

1887 births
1956 deaths
Australian rules footballers from Victoria (Australia)
St Kilda Football Club players
Mordialloc Football Club players